Dichagyris verecunda is a moth of the family Noctuidae. It is found in the region of southern Siberia and Mongolia, including its type location Kyrgyzstan. This species was first described by Rudolf Püngeler in 1898 and named Agrotis verecunda.

References

verecunda
Moths described in 1898